Keram Malicki-Sánchez is an actor, musician, writer, filmmaker, interactive media and virtual reality developer, multimedia artist, and event producer.

Acting career
Malicki-Sánchez debuted in musical theatre at the age of seven in the title role of Oliver! at the Limelight Dinner Theatre in Toronto. He later starred in the original musical version of Mordecai Richler's Jacob Two-Two Meets the Hooded Fang (1984) which won a Dora Mavor Moore Award for Best Revue or Musical, directed by Peter Moss. In 2013, in the role of Kenny, he was chainsawed in half by Leatherface in Texas Chainsaw 3D,
a film that MTV wrote "shocked the box office with [a] #1 debut, topping both Django Unchained and The Hobbit." In 2020 Malicki-Sanchez starred in the role of eccentric artist Zeke in a comedic web series for the Canadian Broadcasting Corporation called 'Decoys'  whose ensemble cast was nominated at the Canadian Screen Awards for Best Web Series.

Musical career
In 1987, at age 13, Malicki-Sanchez released a solo 45" on vinyl, in Spanish, through Ecuador's Fe Discos. In 1990, he founded the record label Constant Change Productions out of Toronto, and formed his band, Blue Dog Pict. The band released three albums: The Picture Album (1990), Anxiety of Influence: a nodding into...? (1992), and Spindly Light Und Wax Rocketines (1995), all distributed by Montreal's Distribution FUSION III. It was included in the book "Any Night of the Week" about the history of Canadian rock music by Jonny Dovercourt.

In 1995, Constant Change released Irrevocable Upgrade, a compilation of exotic musical works which Malicki-Sanchez curated and produced.

In 1998, Malicki-Sanchez launched the band Ribcage, with Eric Ryder Costello and Paul Gallinato, and toured Cleveland and New York, releasing one album, For Machines to Dream About. In 2003 he wrote and performed the song The Truth Be Told for the film Uptown Girls.

In January 2008, Malicki-Sanchez began releasing albums under the solo name Keram, launching a music video for the song Antiskeptic, before releasing his solo debut acoustic album Box. In 2014, he released the album Come to Life, which includes contributions from over 30 musicians, including Alex Lifeson on guitar. He later crowdfunded to produce three songs: (Don't Get Caught) By the Dazzling Charades (2018), Artificial Intelligence (2019) and That Light (2020).

He has also composed for several movies shown on Lifetime Movie Network and PixL: Mr. Write (2016), Twist of Fate (2016), Bad Date Chronicles (2017),Same Time Next Week (2017) and Sleeping With Danger (2020).

Filmmaking
Malicki-Sanchez received certificates in cinematography, digital media, and film producing at UCLA Extension. His first short film A Killer App won the Best Monster Creation award winner at the 2010 Shockfest Film Festival. His short film Tulip Pink was screened at the 2011 Newport Beach Film Festival and other film festivals. His third short How (Not) To Become a Vampire made the festival rounds in 2011, screening at the Austin Film Festival and winning a People's Choice Award at the Zero Film Festival in Toronto.

New media
In 1994, Malicki-Sánchez founded Robot Pride Day, an ironic annual festival that is still celebrated.

In September 2008, Malicki-Sanchez launched Keramcast, a podcast that was a digest for the topics discussed on his various blogs, and at IndieGameReviewer.com, also referred to as 'IGR', an indie game review blog. He maintains the position of editor-in-chief.

In 2020 Malicki-Sanchez was the project lead for a company called Spatialized Events, which was dedicated to immersive media showcases in WebXR. Working with lead developer James Baicoianu, he designed a variety 3D worlds for his VRTO and Festival of International Virtual & Augmented Reality Stories virtual events using threejs and Blender, the latter could also play stereoscopic 4k video with ambisonic audio, VOIP, and video chat (all programmed using the elation engine and powered by JanusWeb and AWS. Malicki-Sanchez developed interfaces and tools to create a solution that could be licensed to 3rd party festivals and conferences. Eighty per cent of the codebase used JavaScript, with the remainder being CSS, PHP, and HTML.

Virtual reality and immersive technology
In 2015, Malicki-Sanchez founded VRTO – a Toronto-based virtual and augmented reality meetup whose inaugural event was held at Ryerson University's Student Learning Center, and Transportive Technology – a virtual-reality content production company which saw Malicki-Sanchez teaming up with Lee Towndrow to create one of the world's first 360 ASMR Immersive videos. This led to the creation of FIVARS, the "Festival of International Virtual and Augmented Reality Stories" which he co-organized with technical director Joseph Ellsworth.

FIVARS debuted at Toronto's Camp Wavelength music festival, and showed the first full viewing of MansLaughter by Cinemersia, which claims to be the world's first virtual reality feature film. FIVARS had its inaugural show in Toronto on 19 and 20 September 2015. The second FIVARS, which was September 16–18, 2016, was at MSMU Studios – a 5,000 square-foot Toronto warehouse redesigned for the festival. Malicki-Sanchez then created the VRTO Virtual & Augmented Reality World Conference & Expo which was staged at  Toronto's Mattamy Athletic Centre (formerly Maple Leaf Gardens).

Malicki-Sanchez has been invited to speak about Virtual Reality and its effects on society at Techweek Toronto, the Canadian National Exhibition, and Cinegear Expo, ideacity.

In 2020, Keram's essays were published in two books: Handbook of Research on the Global Impacts and Roles of Immersive Media, edited by Jacquelyn Ford Morie and Kate McCallum, and Dyscorpia: Future Intersections of the Body and Technology. Also in 2020, Malicki-Sanchez moved the VRTO conference online, creating a multi-platform experience he coined 'The Flotilla'. It used a video-streaming conference app, the Mozilla Hubs web VR platform running custom code on the Amazon Web Services cloud and hosted a micro summit on accessibility.

In October 2020, Malicki-Sanchez was interviewed by podcaster Kent Bye on Voices of VR about the creation of a 4k 360-degree screening space in WebXR for the FIVARS festival. They discussed how, for FIVARS 2021, he created various 3D environments with Blender modelling software and brought them to life using the JanusWeb engine, JavaScript and WebXR and co-developed an immersive 3-screen theater for the web-based event. He was interviewed a second time by Bye to discuss how to curate an international festival for WebXR in 2021 when FIVARS opened its first event in West Hollywood.

In September 2021 Malicki-Sanchez was included in the 100 Original Voices in XR list created by former Apple and Google developer Avi Bar-Zeev.

He was awarded "Creator of the Year" at 2022 Poly Awards for WebXR development of his WebXR festivals, world design, 360 video productions, and online conference.

He produced and brought VRTO back as an in-person event July 20-21st at OCAD University in Toronto, curating a conference about the current surge in text-to-image GAN art and virtual production for television.

Be began teaching Blender for Web3D at UCLA Extension in the fall of 2022.

Television appearances 

 Faerie Tale Theatre (1985), Lame Boy, Willie
 Amerika (1987), Young Caleb
 I'll Take Manhattan (1987), Justin Amberville (child)
 Zardip's Search for Healthy Wellness (1988), Zardip
 The Ray Bradbury Theater (1988), Martin
 Summer Storm (1988), Joey
 Street Legal (1988), Tom Prouse
 Friday the 13th: The Series, Ricky (1988) and Peter Marshak (1989)
 War of the Worlds (1989–1990), Ceeto
 Katts and Dog (1992)
 Catwalk (1992–1993), Johnny Camden
 Ready or Not (1993–1996), The Liz
 TekWar: TekLab (1994), Mustapha
 L.A. Doctors (1999), Alex Atcheson
 Silk Stalkings (1999), Lyn Mocrief and Monk
 Late Last Night (1999), Drag Queen
 Buffy the Vampire Slayer (1999), Freddy Iverson - Episode "Earshot"
 ER (1999), Rick and Goth Kid
 24 (2001), Larry Rogow
 The Guardian (2003), Lucas Farr
 CSI: Crime Scene Investigation (2004), Jamal
 The Jane Show (2004), Iggy
 Without a Trace (2005), Scott
 The L Word (2006), Chase
 Saving Grace (2007), Razor
 Endgame (2011), Naveed
 Charlie's Angels (2011), Lee Bowen
 The Mentalist (2012), Tookie Burroughs
 Flashpoint (2012), Pete Joris
 True Blood (2012), Elijah Stormer
 Decoys (2020), Zeke

Filmography 

 Eleni (1985), Nick's Son
 Boulevard (1994), Sister
 No Contest (1994), Cal
 Skin Deep (1995), Chris Black
 American History X (1998), Chris
 Drive Me Crazy (1999), Rupert
 Cherry Falls (2000), Timmy
 Happy Campers (2001), Jasper
 Crazy/Beautiful (2001), Foster
 John Q (2002), Freddy B
 Global Heresy (Rock My World (US)) (2002), Flit
 Something In Between (2002), Jon Talents
 The Tulse Luper Suitcases, Part 2: Vaux to the Sea (2004), Virgil de Selincourt
 Little Black Book (2004), Waiter
 Queen West (2005), Ross
 Cake (2005), Frank
 Sex and Death 101 (2007), Master Bitchslap
 Punisher: War Zone (2008), Ink
 One Kine Day (2010), Vegas Mike
 A Killer App (2010), Director/Writer/Producer/Editor
 Tulip Pink (2011), Director/Writer/Producer
 How (Not) To Become a Vampire (2011), Director/Producer/Editor
 Irvine Welsh's Ecstasy (2011), Ally
 Texas Chainsaw 3D (2013), Kenny
 The Christmas Switch (2014), Manny
 Anyone Home? (2018), Dean
 Being Perfectly Frank (2020), Kyle

Voice Acting appearances 

 The Care Bears (1986), various
 Clifford the Big Red Dog (1988) various
 Garbage Pail Kids (1988)
 Daniel Tiger's Neighborhood (2022), Felipe

References

External links 

 ConstantChangeMedia.com
 KeramSongs, Malicki-Sánchez's official music site

20th-century Canadian male actors
20th-century Canadian male singers
21st-century Canadian male actors
21st-century Canadian singers
21st-century Canadian male singers
Canadian male child actors
Canadian male film actors
Canadian male screenwriters
Canadian male television actors
Living people
Year of birth missing (living people)